Seinfeld is an American television sitcom starring Jerry Seinfeld.

Seinfeld may also refer to:
 "Seinfeld" (Curb Your Enthusiasm), an episode of Curb Your Enthusiasm

People with the surname
 Jerry Seinfeld (born 1954), American comedian and actor
 Jerry Seinfeld (character), his character on the TV series
 Evan Seinfeld (born 1965), lead singer of Biohazard, second cousin of Jerry Seinfeld
 Jessica Seinfeld (born 1971), American author and philanthropist, wife of Jerry Seinfeld
 John H. Seinfeld (born 1942), American professor and scientist
  (1860-1924), Polish politician 
 Adam Szejnfeld (born 1958), Polish politician